Sarovar Hotels & Resorts are a chain of resorts and hotels throughout India.

Brands
Sarovar Premiere and Park Plaza – upscale (5 star) segment
Sarovar Portico and Park Inn – mid-market (3–4 star) segment
Hometel – 3 star to budget.

Future
Sarovar Hotels announced plans to set up 12 new budget hotels including one in Africa in the country of Kenya.

References

Hotel chains in India
Hospitality companies established in 1994
Privately held companies of India
Companies based in Mumbai
Indian companies established in 1994